The Anthem of Saint Petersburg is the municipal anthem of the Russian federal city of Saint Petersburg since 2003. The music was composed in 1949 by Reinhold Glière, and the lyrics were written by poet  in 2002.

The anthem was fully recognized on May 13, 2002, when the initial version approved by the Legislative Assembly of Saint Petersburg on April 23, edited and then signed into law by the Governor of Saint Petersburg.

Lyrics

History 
 In honor of the 250th anniversary of Saint Petersburg, Russian bard Alexander Gorodnitsky wrote an anthem along music by Soviet composer Reinhold Glière from the ballet Bronze Horseman, which was based on a poem by Alexander Pushkin. 
 Until 2003 the anthem was reportedly performed at official events without lyrics.
 In 2002 the Legislative Assembly launched a competition for the lyrics of the new city anthem. On October 24, 2002, the jury (made out of Honorary Citizens of Saint Petersburg – Zhores Alferov, Alisa Freindlich, Kirill Lavrov and others), declared Oleg Chuprov the winner.
 In December the winning proposal was approved by a Administration committee, and a law on approving the anthem passed in the city legislature on April 23, 2003. The governor of the city signed the law on May 13, 2003.
 The anthem is currently regulated by Paragraph 6, Clause 4 of the Charter of Saint Petersburg.

Authors of the anthem 
 Lyrics – Oleg Chuprov
 Music – "Anthem to a Great City" from the ballet Bronze Horseman by Reinhold Glière, edited by Grigoriy Korchmar

Unofficial city anthems 
Other, unofficial city anthems reportedly include:

 Evening Song («Вечерняя песня») – lyrics by Alexander Churkin, music by Vasily Solovyov-Sedoi;
 Atlases («Атланты») – composed by Alexander Gorodnitsky in 1963;
 Then Live, My City, Live («Так живи, мой град, живи») – composed by Vladislav Irkhin in 2002;
 Saint Petersburg – the Proud White Bird («Санкт-Петербург — гордая белая птица») – composed by Oleg Kvashi as the official anthem of the 300rd anniversary of Saint Petersburg;
 Saint Petersburg («Санкт-Петербург») – composed by Timur Ibragimov in 2003 with lyrics by Eva Kondrashyova

References

See also 
 Coat of arms of Saint Petersburg
 Flag of Saint Petersburg

Russian songs
Russian-language songs
2003 songs
Russian anthems
Saint Petersburg